Gary Tyrone England (born December 5, 1963) is an American country music singer and guitarist. Initially a member of Garth Brooks' band, England began his solo career in 1995, recording a self-titled debut album on RCA Nashville. A second album, Two Ways to Fall, followed in 1996. Three years later, he recorded Highways & Dance Halls under the name Tyler England on Capitol Nashville, and Alive and Well and Livin' the Dream came in 2007 on the independent Triple T label. England has charted six singles on the country chart. His highest-charting single was his debut, "Should've Asked Her Faster", a No. 3 hit in late 1995.

Biography
England began playing guitar during his youth. He sang with various bands in high school, and performed in his school chorus. While working at a coffee shop during his time as a student at Oklahoma State University, fellow student Garth Brooks met him and soon the two were roommates. They performed together until failing grades forced England to move back home. He did eventually get a degree in marketing, but he worked at an automotive paint store.

By 1988, Garth had moved to Nashville, and after landing a recording contract, called England to come be his guitarist and backup vocalist.
In 1995, England left Brooks' road band and signed to RCA Records Nashville. His self-titled debut album, released in late 1995, produced his first chart single in the No. 3 "Should've Asked Her Faster", although the album's other two singles ("Smoke in Her Eyes" and "Redneck Son") fell short of Top 40. A second album, Two Ways to Fall, followed in 1996. It produced his only other Top 40 country hit in the No. 22 "Irresistible You" followed by "All of the Above" at No. 46. After the latter, England exited RCA's roster.

In 1999, England signed to Capitol Nashville, the same label to which Brooks was signed at the time. His third album, Highways & Dance Halls was issued under the name Tyler England. It produced three singles in "Too Many Highways", "I Drove Her to Dallas" (which peaked at No. 53) and "I'd Rather Have Nothing." Also included on this album was a re-recording of "Should've Asked Her Faster", as well as the Bruce Robison song "Travelin' Soldier", which would later become a Number One hit in 2003 for the Dixie Chicks. He did not release another album until 2007's Alive and Well and Livin' the Dream, which included the non-charting singles "Redneck Anthem" and "The Perfect Girl."

Discography

Albums

Singles

Music videos

References

External links
Official Ty England website

1963 births
20th-century American guitarists
American country guitarists
American country singer-songwriters
American male guitarists
Capitol Records artists
Country musicians from Oklahoma
Guitarists from Oklahoma
Living people
Oklahoma State University alumni
RCA Records Nashville artists
Singer-songwriters from Oklahoma
20th-century American male musicians
American male singer-songwriters